The Pennsylvania Medical Society, which was founded in 1848, is a democratic organization governed by its physician members. It represents physicians in public venues including the government, insurance companies, and the media; provides members with timely information, expert services, and professional support on medical practice issues; advances public health, public policy, medical science, education, and ethics; and advocates for patients.

History

Originally named The Medical Society of the State of Pennsylvania, when it was first founded in 1848, it became the 16th state medical society in the United States.  Others included New Jersey, 1766; Massachusetts, 1780; South Carolina, 1789; Delaware, 1789; Connecticut, 1792; Maryland, 1798; Georgia, 1804; New York, 1807; Rhode Island, 1812; Vermont, 1813; Michigan, 1819; Virginia, 1821; Tennessee, 1830; Wisconsin, 1841; and Alabama, 1846.  It was not until 1847 that these organizations formed the American Medical Association.

Prior to the founding of The Medical Society of the State of Pennsylvania, the Keystone State had few county or district medical societies.  Those in existence were the College of Physicians, 1787; Philadelphia County Medical Society, 1796; Warren County Medical Society, 1821; Medical Faculty of Berks County, 1824; Franklin County Medical Society, 1825; Chester County Medical Society, 1828; Susquehanna County Medical Society, 1838; Mercer County Medical Society, 1843; Lancaster City and County Medical Society, 1844; Schuylkill County Medical Society, 1845; Northern Medical Association of Philadelphia, 1847; Lebanon County Medical Society, 1847; Mifflin County Medical Society, 1847; and the Medical Faculty of Montgomery County, 1847.

The Pennsylvania Medical Society was organized on April 11, 1848, at the Methodist Episcopal Church in Lancaster. Today, at this location is an historical marker that reads "Founded April 11, 1848, at the First Methodist Episcopal Church on this site. Its purpose was to foster the advancement of medical knowledge, relieve suffering, and promote the health of the community. Samuel Humes, M.D. of Lancaster was the first president." The marker was dedicated on October 16, 1998.  It is located at North Duke & Walnut Streets, Lancaster.

See also
 American Medical Association
 Pennsylvania Society of Oncology and Hematology

External links
 Medical Society

References

Organizations based in Pennsylvania
American Medical Association
1848 establishments in Pennsylvania
Organizations established in 1848